Aftab Seth (born 17 September 1943) is a retired Indian diplomat who served as ambassador of India to Greece, Vietnam and Japan. He is the brother of British-Indian actor Roshan Seth.

Education 
Seth completed his schooling from The Doon School. He then went on to pursue B.A. (Honours) in History from St. Stephen's College, University of Delhi where he topped the university with First Class honours. He then received a Rhodes Scholarship to read History and Politics, Constitutional History at Christ Church, Oxford. He then proceeded to do a Doctorate in Law from American College of Greece.

Outline of career 
1968 - Joined the Foreign Service
1970-72 - Served as Third Secretary and Second Secretary, Embassy of India, Tokyo, Private Secretary to the Ambassador
1979-83 - Consul General of India, Hamburg, with commercial consular;Jurisdiction over Bremen Bremerhaven Schleswig-Holstein and lower Saxony
1983-85 - Deputy Chief of Mission, Embassy of India, Jakarta
1985-88 - Consul General of India, Karachi, Pakistan
1988-92 - Spokesman of the Foreign Office and Joint Secretary in-charge of External Publicity, New Delhi, India
1992-96 - Ambassador of India, Athens, Greece
1997-2000 - Ambassador of India, Hanoi, Vietnam
2000-03 - Ambassador of India, Tokyo, Japan; also concurrently accredited as Ambassador of India to Federal States of Micronesia
2004-06 - Professor and Director of Global Security Research Institute, Keio University
2006 – present Chairman of the International Advisory Committee, Keio University ; Present Chairman & CEO, India Global Link Co., Ltd.; chairman, Japan-India Partnership Forum; Professor of Global Security Research Institute, Keio University; Visiting Professor, Indian Institute of Technology Bombay

He is also on the advisory board of World Development Forum, an upcoming forum that aims to bring together citizens' groups, development organizations, businesses and governments, to a common platform to produce, evidence-based politically actionable guidance and unlock greater value, through human enterprise.

He is also one of the advisory board members of Gyankriti, a chain of affordable preschool and daycare centers founded by Indian Institute of Technology Bombay alumni.

Honours 
 Grand Cordon of the Order of the Rising Sun (2015)

See also
 Syed Akbaruddin

References 

Alumni of Christ Church, Oxford
Keio University alumni
The Doon School alumni
Ambassadors of India to Greece
Ambassadors of India to Vietnam
2000
Ambassadors of India to the Federated States of Micronesia
Indian expatriates in Pakistan
Indian Rhodes Scholars
Living people
1943 births